The EuroHockey Championship IV, formerly known as the EuroHockey Nations Challenge II,  is a competition for European national field hockey teams. It is the fourth level of the European field hockey Championships for national teams.

For men's national teams this is the lowest tier. There is promotion and relegation. The one or two first ranked teams qualify for the next Men's EuroHockey Championship III and are replaced by the one or two lowest-ranked teams from that tournament.

The tournament has been won by seven different teams: Gibraltar has the most titles with two and Denmark, Greece, Hungary, Slovakia, Slovenia and Turkey have all won the tournament once. The most recent edition was held in Helsinki, Finland and was won by Hungary. The next edition was supposed to be held in Kordin, Malta in August 2021 but was cancelled due to the travel restrictions related to the COVID-19 pandemic.

Results

Summary

* = host nation

Team appearances

See also
Men's EuroHockey Championship III

References

External links
European Hockey Federation

 
International field hockey competitions in Europe
Recurring sporting events established in 2005
2005 establishments in Europe